Hertsa, Hertza or Herța may refer to:

 Hertsa, a town in Ukraine
 Hertsa (river), a river in Romania and Ukraine
 Hertsa Raion, a former administrative unit in Ukraine
 Hertsa region, a geographic region in Ukraine, formerly part of Romania
 Teodor Herța, Moldovan politician
 Vladimir Herța, Moldovan politician and mayor of Chișinău